Clustertruck is a platform game developed by independent Swedish studio Landfall Games and published by tinyBuild. It was released for Microsoft Windows, macOS, Linux, PlayStation 4, and Xbox One on 27 September 2016.  It was released for Nintendo Switch on 15 March 2018.

Gameplay 
In Clustertruck, the player controls a character from a first-person perspective. They are set to jump onto a moving line of trucks, avoiding obstacles and truck pile-ups and crashes. The player is usually unable to touch anything other than trucks, and will otherwise fail their task of reaching the goal at the end of the level.

On each stage, the player is scored based on how fast they reach a goal line and a number of style points based on various tricks, such as jumping off a truck that is currently in mid-air. The player's cumulative score points can be used to purchase one of several abilities, such as a double jump or a quick boost of speed, which can then be used to either successfully pass more difficult levels or to improve one's time and scoring on earlier ones.

Development 
Development on Clustertruck started in September 2015, after the development on Landfall Games' previous game, Square Brawl, was finished. The game was officially revealed on 16 December 2015 with a trailer and a release date of April 2016. At PAX South 2016, it was announced that Landfall Games had signed a publishing deal with tinyBuild. This deal led the developers to push the release date to the third quarter of 2016, where Landfall Games CEO Wilhem Nylund said that it was "initially intended for the game to be a small project with a short development", but changed his mind and considered the game to be delayed even further, as it has "gaining more and more traction." As an April Fool's Day joke, Landfall released a free demo version of Clustertruck called Supertruck that incorporated the visual style and mechanic of the recently released Superhot, in which the internal clock within the game moves forward when the player-character moves.

Landfall released preview copies of the game to various YouTube and Twitch streamers to help promote the title. The game was released on 27 September 2016.

Reception

Notes

References

External links 
 

2016 video games
First-person video games
Linux games
MacOS games
Nintendo Switch games
PlayStation 4 games
Steam Greenlight games
Video games with Steam Workshop support
Video games developed in Sweden
Windows games
Xbox Cloud Gaming games
Xbox One games
TinyBuild games
Platform games
Indie video games